Ian McInroy (born 20 January 1979 in Irvine, Scotland) is a former Scottish Sevens international professional rugby union player, and a former Glasgow Warriors player. He played Centre but could also cover Wing or Full Back.

The Centre started at Garnock RFC before moving on to West of Scotland.

McInroy signed for Glasgow Warriors in 1999. When not playing for the Warriors, McInroy played for Glasgow Hawks.

He also played for the Scotland Sevens and captained the Under 21 side.

McInroy took a work experience role at Argyll Investments in Edinburgh and began a Bachelor of Science degree in Economics in 2003 at Cambridge. He played for Cambridge University rugby team.

He also played for London Scottish.

References

External links
European matches
Pro12 matches
Statsbunker profile

1979 births
Living people
Glasgow Warriors players
Glasgow Hawks players
West of Scotland FC players
London Scottish F.C. players
Cambridge R.U.F.C. players
Garnock RFC players
Scotland international rugby sevens players
Male rugby sevens players
Alumni of Hughes Hall, Cambridge